Tepavci is a village in the municipality of Novaci, North Macedonia.

Demographics
According to the 2021 census, the village had a total of 17 inhabitants. Ethnic groups in the village include:

Macedonians 16
Albanians 1

References

External links

Villages in Novaci Municipality